C-Tran (stylized as C-TRAN), more formally the Clark County Public Transit Benefit Area Authority, is a public transit agency serving Clark County, Washington, United States, including the cities of Battle Ground, Camas, Vancouver, Washougal, and Yacolt. Founded in 1981, C-Tran operates fixed route bus services within Clark County, as well as paratransit services for qualified persons with disabilities (C-Van) and a dial-a-ride service in Camas, Ridgefield, and La Center (The Connector). C-Tran also provides express commuter services between Clark County and various points in Portland, Oregon, including downtown, the Parkrose/Sumner and Delta Park MAX Light Rail stations (in northeast and north Portland), Lloyd District, and Oregon Health and Science University.

C-Tran operates three transit centers: Vancouver Mall, Fisher's Landing in east county, and 99th Street at Stockford Village, as well as three park and rides: Salmon Creek, Evergreen, and Andresen.  Twenty-nine transit routes operate to serve the approximately 350,000 residents of Clark County, while C-Tran's 108 transit coaches and 52 paratransit coaches travel over

History

Pre-2000 

The Clark County public transportation benefit area was approved by 55 percent of voters on November 4, 1980, along with a 0.3 percent sales tax, and formally established on January 1, 1981. The agency branded itself as "C-Tran" and took over the Vancouver Transit System on July 6, 1981. The Vancouver system was originally established in May 1969 and was supplemented by Tri-Met express service from Portland that began in 1976. The Tri-Met service continued under contract after C-Tran was established and gradually phased out.

Service increases and reorganization in 2000 
On July 1, 2000, C-Tran opened a transit center facility in Fisher's Landing, replacing the Evergreen Transit Center (now Evergreen Park & Ride) as its east county hub. Along with the opening of Fisher's Landing Transit Center, many lines serving east Clark County and the Vancouver Mall area were rerouted and had their frequency increased.  Fisher's Landing Transit Center links eastern Vancouver with Camas, Washougal and Parkrose (in northeast Portland, Oregon).  Around the same time, C-Tran changed its transfer design to conform with that of TriMet, allowing C-Tran riders to use its transfer to ride on any route in any direction (unlike previously, in which C-Tran transfers were marked with the route number to prevent riders from using it to make a round trip or a stop-over).  The "Day Code" on a C-Tran transfer (and today, C-Tran Day Pass) is identical to that of TriMet, consisting of two letters out of the eight-letter pool: M, J, I, E, X, D, B and C.

Clark County Proposition 1 (2004) 
In November 2004, a ballot initiative known as Proposition 1 was defeated by a simple majority of voters. While 46.33% of eligible voters, or 73,959 ballots, approved this measure to increase the Clark County sales tax by 0.3% (from the current 7.7%) to continue the funding of the public transportation, 53.67% (85,684 votes) rejected the proposition.

The Proposition 1 was intended to provide continued funding sources for C-Tran after the 1998 statewide repeal of Washington motor vehicle registration tax.

As a result of the lost revenue, effective September 25, 2005, C-Tran could have reduced its services by 46%, effectively eliminating about a half of currently existing bus and paratransit services.  The planned service reduction would have eliminated all services to the north beyond Salmon Creek Park & Ride, including commuter services to Ridgefield; all services to the east beyond Fisher's Landing Transit Center, discontinuing all Camas and Washougal services including the Connector; end all Vancouver-Central Portland express bus services; and drastically reduced the frequency of surviving routes (except for the 165-Parkrose Express, whose services would be increased).

Vancouver–Central Portland commuter lines would have been replaced by 205 – Interstate 5 Shuttle, 234 – Salmon Creek Shuttle and 257 – BPA Shuttle, all of which would have terminated at TriMet's Delta Park/Vanport MAX Station.

In addition to major downsizing of services, C-Tran proposed closing two park and ride lots, reducing service center hours, ending service day at 8 pm weekdays and ending most weekend runs.  As a result, C-Tran intended to also lay off a large number of employees.

To make up lost revenues, the C-Tran board of directors also considered a fare increase, elimination of free transfers and termination of reciprocal fare agreement with TriMet.

Most of these service reductions were avoided after C-Tran passed a special ballot measure in September 2005.  C-Tran still operates all commuter lines to and from downtown Portland's Transit Mall.

New fare structure and 2005 service reductions 
In May 2005, as the first phase of the two-part service reduction strategy, C-Tran introduced a new fare structure.  Under this scheme, the previously All-Zone commuter services between Portland, Oregon and Clark County with the sole exception of the 165 – Parkrose Express were designated "Premium" routes (i.e., Routes 105, 114 that originate in Portland as "105–114", 134, 157, 164, 177 and 190 are all Premium services).  No regular monthly or all-day passes from either TriMet or C-Tran were accepted on the Premium buses, unless a passenger purchased a $105 Premium pass (which is also valid as an All-Zone pass in C-Tran, Portland Streetcar and TriMet). A single-ride fare on a Premium bus became $3.  Fares on Premium buses were collected as passengers board, and previously-allowed free rides within Portland's Fareless Square between Portland State University and the Pearl District were eliminated.

C-Tran issues and accepts All-Zone transfers upon request. Passengers who use a C-Zone fare must pay each time they board the bus or purchase a Day Pass, either a C-Zone day pass valid only on C-Tran Local and Limited routes or a GoAnywhere Express Day pass which is also valid on TriMet and the Portland Streetcar. Pursuant to the fare reciprocity agreement, C-Tran and TriMet continue to honor each other's All-Zone fare instruments.

C-Tran would have been forced to eliminate nearly half of all its transit services effective September 25, 2005 if additional funding had not been secured; however, a second ballot measure was passed that allowed for the preservation of current service levels (at that time), and additional service to be added to smaller cities such as Ridgefield and La Center. These changes helped return service to its pre-2000 levels.

C-Tran redistricting and new C-Tran benefit area ballot measure 
On June 1, 2005, the boundaries of the Clark County Public Transit Benefit Area were reduced from the whole Clark County to the area including only the cities of Vancouver, Camas, Washougal, Ridgefield, La Center, Battle Ground and Yacolt, as well as the unincorporated areas surrounding Vancouver.  This was done so that, unlike in the failed 2004 Proposition 1, only those who would benefit from C-Tran services will vote on any future ballot measure to secure new funding for the transit service.

C-Tran proposed a special election in September 2005 to decide on whether residents within the new C-Tran benefit area would pay an additional 0.2% (from 7.7% to 7.9% in Vancouver) sales tax to maintain the current C-Tran service level.

The measure passed by a wide majority. The agency continues to operate, and now with fresh funding, is expanding.

2010s 

After studies that had first taken place in 2008, plans were approved and finalized in 2012 for construction of a bus rapid transit line, eventually named The Vine (see section below).  It opened for service in January 2017.  In 2016–2017, C-Tran built a new transit center at Vancouver Mall, to replace an existing transit center on the mall's north side (opened in 1985) with a larger facility on the mall's south side.  The new Vancouver Mall Transit Center opened in January 2017, on the same date that the Vine service began operating.

In June 2017, C-Tran hired Shawn M. Donaghy as its next Executive Director/CEO (effective June 26), under a three-year contract.  He replaced Jeff Hamm, who retired after more than 10 years as the agency's chief executive. The agency was named the 2019 Transit System of the Year by the American Public Transportation Association.

Service 

C-Tran operates seven days a week. Sunday and holiday services are reduced, with trips to and from Portland being less frequent, and some express and limited routes may not run. Local service starts at about 6:15 am and ends about midnight. Weekday express and limited service to Portland begins at 5:20 am with the last trip to Vancouver at 7 pm. On weekends, there is no service to Portland excluding the 60 (Delta Park Limited) to Delta Park/Vanport MAX Station and Jantzen Beach and the 65 (Parkrose Limited) to Parkrose/Sumner Transit Center. Weekend service on route 60 starts at about 6:30 am and the last trip from Delta Park/Vanport departs at midnight. Weekend service on route 65 starts at about 8:30 am with the last trip to Vancouver departing at about 6:40 pm. The Connector, a dial-a-ride service, runs from 5:30 am to 7:30 pm on weekdays.

C-Tran operates 17 local routes along with "C-Van" paratransit and The Connector, a dial-a-ride service. Most routes can be expected to run every 15 to 70 minutes. The most-used routes are The Vine and the 37 (Mill Plain/Fisher's).

C-Tran operates seven express routes to the Portland Transit Mall. A ride on all these buses require an express fare, and transfers issued on these routes are valid for travel on all C-Tran and TriMet routes. In addition, C-Tran operates four limited-stop routes; the 41 serves Fisher's Landing Transit Center and Downtown Vancouver, the 47 and 60 serve TriMet's Delta Park/Vanport MAX Station, and the 65 connects to TriMet's Parkrose/Sumner Transit Center. Except for the 41, a regional fare is required on these routes, which are valid for transferring to TriMet services.

The Vine 

The Vine is a bus rapid transit service along Fourth Plain Boulevard and Fort Vancouver Way between downtown Vancouver and Vancouver Mall. Ten new low-floor, articulated, hybrid buses provide service every 10–15 minutes in mixed traffic to curbside stations. The Vine replaced routes 4 and 44, which collectively carried over 6,000 trips daily. Among the project's expected benefits were that transit signal priority and off-board fare collection would increase the speed of the bus by about ten minutes compared to existing service. Studies on the corridor began in 2008, and funding for the $53 million project was approved in July 2014, with 80% federal money, 6% state, and 14% local. A full funding grant agreement for $38.5 million from the Federal Transit Administration was signed on September 10, 2015.

Construction began with a groundbreaking ceremony held at the planned downtown terminus on August 24, 2015, and finished in January 2017. A grand opening ceremony was held on January 7, 2017, and it officially opened on January 8, 2017.

In November 2014, opponents of the projects filed a lawsuit challenging C-Tran's authority to use federal funds for bus rapid transit without voter approval.

Fares 

Effective November 20, 2022, C-Tran cash fares are as follows:

 Local fares are valid only within Clark County and are not eligible for transfers.
 Regional fares are valid on all non-Express C-Tran & TriMet buses, MAX Light Rail, WES Commuter Rail and Portland Streetcar and are eligible for transfers upon request.
 Regional and Express fares are required for cross-river travel to Parkrose, Jantzen Beach and Delta Park.
 Express fares are valid on Express C-Tran routes, in addition to Regional benefits. Express fares are required for travel to/from Downtown Portland, Marquam Hill and the Lloyd District on express routes and are eligible for transfers upon request.
 Express fare exception: Honored passengers (Seniors and those with disabilities), and Medicare card holders can save 50% off Express cash fares by riding the 105 from 9 am–3 pm, weekdays only. Must present ID at boarding.
 Regional Day Pass is only available for sale on board a C-Tran bus or through Tri-Met.
 Youth (18 and under): Beginning October 1, 2022 anyone who is 18 years and younger can ride C-TRAN Local services for free including fixed-route, C-VAN paratransit (certain restrictions apply), The Current microtransit and Vanpool services. Additional charges apply if transferring to Regional and Express service, or to other transit systems.

Fare agreement with TriMet 
C-Tran began issuing transfers again on September 1, 2007. In order to make travel between C-Tran and TriMet's systems easier, certain C-Tran fares are valid on TriMet, and vice versa. The following are the easiest reciprocal fares to use...

C-Tran fares on TriMet

C-Tran issues transfers for its Regional and Express fares. All C-Tran Regional and Express regular or discounted fares and transfers are valid as Regional fares on any and all of TriMet's buses, MAX trains, WES and the Portland Streetcar. A C-Tran Express Day Pass is valid as a TriMet All-Day ticket. The WSUV/Clark College BackPASS is not valid on TriMet. The express fares are valid on the Portland Aerial Tram.

TriMet fares on C-Tran

TriMet fares are valid as Regional fares on C-Tran except for the Portland Public Schools Student Pass (it can be used as proof of age for youth fares) or TriMet Lift.  A TriMet All-Day ticket is valid as a C-Tran day pass.

TriMet tickets and passes are accepted on C-Tran Local and Limited routes; TriMet fares are not accepted on C-Tran Express routes or C-Van; Unvalidated TriMet fares are same as cash, and upgrades are not available.

TriMet accepts C-Tran Regional and Express tickets and passes on all fixed route, WES, and MAX services; C-Tran fares are not valid on TriMet Lift (paratransit).

Only C-Tran express fares and passes are valid on C-Tran's express routes to downtown Portland.

Unvalidated C-Tran/TriMet fares

Effective September 1, 2014, C-Tran and TriMet will no longer accept each other's unvalidated tickets or day passes. Passengers must start their trip on the system that issued their unvalidated fare.

Express punch cards will be provided with an Express transfer that allows for continued travel on TriMet, through the date and time indicated. Regional and Express day passes may be used on TriMet, once they have been validated by a C-Tran operator.

TriMet Hop Fastpass

Starting in July 2017, TriMet implemented a shared pass system called Hop Fastpass that is valid for TriMet, C-Tran, and Portland Streetcar fares. The system uses contactless cards and smartphone payments.

Fleet 

C-Tran has several "community buses" that are wrapped in photographs and designs to reflect local communities in Clark County. They debuted in 2019 and include seven city wraps and an eighth for unincorporated Clark County.

Current fixed-route bus fleet

Current C-Van paratransit bus fleet

References

External links 

 C-Tran
 C-Tran-TriMet fare reciprocation policy

Bus transportation in Washington (state)
Bus transportation in Oregon
Transportation in Clark County, Washington
Transportation in Vancouver, Washington
Transit agencies in Washington (state)
1981 establishments in Washington (state)